Beit Hanoun or Beit Hanun is a city on the northeast edge of the Gaza Strip. According to the Palestinian Central Bureau of Statistics, the town had a population of 32,187 in mid-2006. It is administered by the Hamas administration. After 19 Palestinian civilians died during shelling by the IDF in 2006, the United Nations appointed a fact-finding commission, to be led by Desmond Tutu, to investigate if the shelling constituted a war crime; but the investigation was cancelled due to the lack of Israeli cooperation.

History

The Ayyubids defeated the Crusaders at a battle in Umm al-Nasser hill, just west of Beit Hanoun in 1239, and built the Umm al-Naser Mosque ("Mother of Victories Mosque") there in commemoration of the victory. A Mamluk post office was located in Beit Hanoun as well.

Ottoman era
Incorporated into the Ottoman Empire in 1517 with all of Palestine,  Beit Hanoun appeared in the 1596 tax registers  as being in the Nahiya of Gaza, part of Gaza Sanjak. It had a population of 36 Muslim households and paid a fixed tax rate of 33,3% on wheat, barley, summer crops, fruit trees,  occasional revenues,  goats and/ or beehives; a total of 9,300 akçe.

Pierre Jacotin named  the village Deir Naroun on his map from 1799.

In 1838 Edward Robinson passed by, and described how "all were busy with the wheat harvest; the reapers were in the fields;  donkeys and camels were moving homewards with their high loads of sheaves; while on the threshing-floors near the village I counted not less than thirty gangs of cattle.." He further noted it as a Muslim village, located in the Gaza district.

In May 1863, the French explorer Victor Guérin visited the village. Among the gardens he observed indications of ancient constructions in the shape of cut stones, fragments of columns, and bases. Socin found from an official Ottoman village list from about 1870  that   Beit Hanoun had   94 houses and a population of  294, though the population count included  men, only. Hartmann found that  Bet Hanun had 95  houses.

In 1883 the PEF's Survey of Western Palestine described it as a small adobe village, "surrounded by gardens, with a well to the west. The ground is flat, and to the east is a pond beside the road."

British Mandate era
In the 1922 census of Palestine conducted by the British Mandate authorities, Beit Hanoun had a population of 885 inhabitants, all Muslim, decreasing in the 1931 census to 849, still all Muslims, in 194 houses.

In  the  1945 statistics  Beit Hanun had a population of 1,680 Muslims and 50 Jews,  with 20,025 dunams of land, according to an official land and population survey. Of this, 2,768 dunams were for citrus and bananas, 697 were plantations and irrigable land, 13,186 used for cereals, while 59 dunams were built-up land.

Egyptian occupation

In the 1948 Arab–Israeli War, the vicinity of Beit Hanoun, and later Beit Hanoun itself, served as an Israeli tactical wedge (Beit Hanoun wedge) to halt the movement of the Egyptian army from Ashkelon to forces to the south in the area that later became the Gaza Strip.

During the occupation, Egypt complained to the Mixed Armistice Commission that on the 7 and 14 October 1950 Israeli military forces had shelled and machine-gunned the Arab villages of Abasan al-Kabera and Beit Hanoun in Egyptian controlled territory of the Gaza strip. According to Egypt this action caused the death of seven and the wounding of twenty civilians.

Israeli occupation

According to the Palestinian Authority, 140 Palestinians were killed by Israeli forces in Beit Hanoun from September 2000 to November 2006.

The Israeli army besieged Beit Hanoun from 15 May to 30 June 2003, during which it demolished dozens of houses, razed large areas of agricultural land and largely destroyed the civilian infrastructure of the town. During the Raid on Beit Hanoun in 2004, the town was besieged for 37 days. About 20 Palestinians were killed and again immense damage was caused to property and infrastructure. The infrastructure of Beit Hanoun was heavily damaged during an incursion by Israeli forces in 2005.

Following the removal of Israeli settlers from Gaza in August 2005 the 2006 shelling of Beit Hanoun, killed 19 Palestinian civilians.  In December 2006, the UN appointed a fact-finding commission led by Anglican Archbishop Desmond Tutu to investigate the attack. However, Tutu and the other members were not granted permission to travel by Israel and the investigation was cancelled. Tutu's final report to the United Nations human rights council concluded, however, that "[I]n the absence of a well-founded explanation from the Israeli military – who is in sole possession of the relevant facts – the mission must conclude that there is a possibility that the shelling of Beit Hanoun constituted a war crime."

On 27 March 2007, sewage water flooded the northern Umm al-Nasser suburb of Beit Hanoun, killing five people.

Beit Hanoun was hit several times by shells and rockets during the 2014 Israel–Gaza conflict. The shelling of an UNWRA Elementary school by Israel killed 11-15 people, including women and children. The Israeli Defense forces claimed that "the IDF encountered heavy fire in vicinity of the school, including anti-tank missile... [and] that an errant mortar did indeed land in the empty courtyard of the school."

Educational and health institutions
There are twelve secondary, primary and agricultural schools in Beit Hanoun and an agricultural college which is related to al-Azhar University - Gaza. There is a medical center and hospital in the city and several clinics mostly managed by the United Nations.

Demographics
In 1922, Beit Hanoun had a population of 885. The population more than doubled by 1945. In that year, a land and population survey recorded 1,730 inhabitants including 50 Jews.
In 1961, the population rose to 3,876.

In the first official census by the Palestinian Central Bureau of Statistics (PCBS), Beit Hanoun had a population of 20,780. Over 90% of the residents were Palestinian refugees. There were 10,479 males and 10,301 females. People of 14 years of age or younger constituted the majority at 65.6%, people between the ages of 20 and 44 was 26.8%, 45 to 64 was 5.7% and residents above the age of 65 was 1.9%.

See also
 2004 Israeli operation in the northern Gaza Strip
 2006 Israeli operation in Beit Hanoun

References

Bibliography

External links
Welcome To The City of Bayt Hanun
Survey of Western Palestine, Map 19: IAA, Wikimedia commons

 
Cities in the Gaza Strip
Municipalities of the State of Palestine